Indra's Net: Defending Hinduism's Philosophical Unity is a 2014 book by Rajiv Malhotra, an Indian-American author, philanthropist and public speaker, published by HarperCollins.

The book is an appeal against the thesis of neo-Hinduism and a defense of Vivekananda's view of Yoga and Vedanta. The book argues for a unity, coherence, and continuity of the Yogic and Vedantic traditions of Hinduism and Hindu philosophy. It makes proposals for defending Hinduism from what the author considers to be unjust attacks from scholars, misguided public intellectuals, and hostile religious polemicists.

A revised edition was published in 2016 after other scholars asserted plagiarism in the original edition.

Background and release
Malhotra had written several previous books defending various aspects of Hinduism. He states that Indra's Net was catalyzed by a 2012 panel at the meetings of the American Academy of Religion to discuss his book Being Different (2011). Two panelists based their objections against the book on the "single premise" that no unified Hindu tradition existed. These panelists "regarded any notion of Hindu unity as a dangerous fabrication and saw me as guilty of propagating it." Malhotra had known of several distinct cases of bias

The book's central metaphor is "Indra's Net". As a scriptural image "Indra's Net" was first mentioned in the Atharva Veda (c. 1000 BCE). In Buddhist philosophy, Indra's Net served as a metaphor in the Avatamsaka Sutra and was further developed by Huayen Buddhism to portray the interconnectedness of everything in the universe.
Malhotra employs the metaphor of Indra's Net to express

The book uses Indra's Net as a metaphor for the understanding of the universe as a web of connections and interdependences, an understanding which Malhotra wants to revive as the foundation for Vedic cosmology, a perspective that he asserts has "always been implicit" in the outlook of the ordinary Hindu.

Indra's Net was released in India on 29 January 2014 at the Vivekananda International Foundation, where a talk was given by Arun Shourie.
Shourie stated that in the book, Malhotra "has given us a pair of spectacles, a new pair of spectacles through which to understand... our own religions and our own tradition".

Reviews
Reviews have appeared in
Mental Health, Religion & Culture,The Economic Times,The Free Press Journal and other venues.

In Mental Health, Religion & Culture, Doug Oman wrote that "Indra’s Net is a stimulating, valuable, and partly contentious book that, despite some errors in details, supplies needed correctives for one cluster of serious imbalances in how contemporary
Hinduism has been presented. Over time, concerns it highlights could and should inform health professional training materials for religious diversity". He also suggested that "Proposing the distinctive core of Hinduism as a dynamic 'open architecture' is perhaps the book’s most stimulating and important scientific contribution," a model that "suggests many new lines for empirical inquiry" and that "might be adapted to study 'spiritual but not religious' Westerners".

In The Economic Times, Vithal Nadkarni noted the Atharva Vedic origins of the image of Indra's net. To the reviewer, Malhotra's contention that Hinduism has always spanned traditional, modern and post-modern categories "evokes the image of Shiva's Trinity, also known as that of Master of Time past, present and future, enshrined at... Elephanta".

In The Free Press Journal, M. V. Kamath wrote that "Malhotra has done his job in explaining Hinduism [remarkably] well".

Subramanian Swamy, former president of the Janata Party (1990–2013), stated with regard to Indra's Net that "this kind of writing is something that ultimately should become textbook reading for graduate students in India". He added that "this imperialism in scholarship [as criticized in the book] is something that Rajiv Malhotra is fighting alone; we need much more support being given to him".

Response

Anantanand Rambachan
Anantanand Rambachan, whose work was repeatedly criticized in Indra's Net, especially in Chapter 6 ("Rambachan's Argument to Fragment Hinduism"), published a response in the Indian right-wing cultural magazine Swarajya. Rambachan stated that "too many of his [Malhotra's] descriptions of my scholarship belong appropriately to the realm of fiction and are disconnected from reality." Rambachan organized his lengthy response "around thirteen of his [Malhotra's] 'myths' about my work. I can easily double this number," also stating that 

Allegations of plagiarism
In July 2015, Richard Fox Young of Princeton Theological Seminary and Andrew J.Nicholson who authored Unifying Hinduism, alleged Malhotra plagiarized Unifying Hinduism in Indra's Net. Nicholson further said that Malhotra not only had plagiarised his book, but also " twists the words and arguments of respectable scholars to suit his own ends." Permanent Black, publisher of Nicholson's Unifying Hinduism, stated that they would welcome HarperCollins "willingness to rectify future editions" of Indra's Net.

In response to Nicholson, Malhotra stated "I used your work with explicit references 30 times in Indra’s Net, hence there was no ill-intention." He announced that he will be eliminating all references to Nicholson and further explained:{{quote|I am going to actually remove many of the references to your work simply because you have borrowed from Indian sources and called them your own original ideas [...] Right now, it is western Indologists like you who get to define ‘critical editions’ of our texts and become the primary source and adhikari. This must end and I have been fighting this for 25 years [...] we ought to examine where you got your materials from, and to what extent you failed to acknowledge Indian sources, both written and oral, with the same weight with which you expect me to do so.<ref group=web name="Malhotra-rejoinder">{{Cite web |url=http://archive.niticentral.com/2015/07/18/rajiv-malhotra-has-a-rejoinder-to-andrew-nicholson-324312.html?PageSpeed=noscript |title=Rajiv Malhotra, Rajiv Malhotra has a rejoinder to Andrew Nicholson |access-date=2016-02-17 |archive-url=https://web.archive.org/web/20160808185700/http://archive.niticentral.com/2015/07/18/rajiv-malhotra-has-a-rejoinder-to-andrew-nicholson-324312.html?PageSpeed=noscript |archive-date=2016-08-08 |url-status=dead }}</ref>}}
In the revised second edition,<ref
   name=inet2016>  (400 pages) (revised chapter 8, with references, is available online)</ref> Malhotra eliminated the thirty references to Nicholson's book:

Revised edition

A revised edition of Indra's Net was published by HarperCollins India in 2016. The revised edition omits most references to the work of Andrew Nicholson, and further explains Malhotra's ideas concerning the unity of Hinduism as inherent in the tradition from the times of its Vedic origins. The revised chapter 8, with references, is available online.

See also
 Unifying Hinduism
 Breaking India
 Invading the Sacred
 Being Different
 The Battle for Sanskrit

Notes

References

Web-references

Sources

External links

 Synopsis at Hinduism Today

2014 non-fiction books
HarperCollins books
Hinduism studies books
Indian non-fiction books
Philosophy books
21st-century Indian books
Neo-Vedanta